Côte d'Ivoire competed at the 2004 Summer Paralympics in Athens, Greece.   These were their third Games.  They were represented by two male athletes who did not medal.

Team 
The team included two athletes, both of them male, and won no medals.

Sports

Athletics

Men's track

Powerlifting

See also
Côte d'Ivoire at the Paralympics
Côte d'Ivoire at the 2004 Summer Olympics

References 

Nations at the 2004 Summer Paralympics
2004
Summer Paralympics